Springfield Southeast High School (SSHS or Southeast High School to natives) is a public high school located in Springfield, Illinois. It is the youngest high school serving Springfield Public Schools District 186, the oldest and second oldest being Springfield High School and Lanphier High School respectively. True to its name, this school feeds from the southeast area of Springfield.

As of the 2014-2015 school year, the school had an enrollment of 1,369 students and 90.05 classroom teachers (on a FTE basis), for a student-teacher ratio of 15.20:1. The school is well known for its athletics, mainly basketball. They are the current City Champions in basketball. The school has had a choir member be selected for the Young Americans.

A large fiberglass "Muffler Man" statue of a Spartan warrior stands above the front entrance of the school. The statue originally stood at a home builders business and was meant to portray a Viking but was later modified.

References

Educational institutions established in 1967
Public high schools in Illinois
Schools in Springfield, Illinois